A Killough platform is a three-wheel drive system that uses traditional wheels to achieve omni-directional movement without the use of omni-directional wheels (such as omni wheels/Mecanum wheels).  Designed by Stephen Killough, after which the platform is named, with help from Francois Pin, wanted to achieve omni-directional movement without using the complicated six motor arrangement required to achieve a controllable three caster wheel system (one motor to control wheel rotation and one motor to control pivoting of the wheel).   He first looked into solutions by other inventors that used rollers on the rims larger wheels but considered them flawed in some critical way.  This led to the Killough system: 

With Francois Pin, who helped with the computer control and choreography aspects of the design, Killough and Pin readied a public demonstration in 1994.  This led to a partnership with Cybertrax Innovative Technologies in 1996 which was developing a motorized wheelchair.

By combining two the motion of two-wheel the vehicle can move in the direction of the perpendicular wheel or by rotating all the wheels in the same direction the vehicle can rotate in place.  By using the resultant motion of the vector addition of the wheels a Killough platform is able to achieve omni-directional motion.

References

Robotics